There have been twenty one baronetcies created for persons with the surname Williams, eight in the Baronetage of England, three in the Baronetage of Great Britain and ten in the Baronetage of the United Kingdom. Only six of the creations are extant . 

The Williams Baronetcy, of Vaynol in the County of Carnarvon, was created in the Baronetage of England on 15 June 1622 for William Williams. The sixth Baronet represented Caernarvonshire in the House of Commons. On his death in 1696 the title became extinct.

The Williams Baronetcy, of Marnhull in the County of Dorset, was created in the Baronetage of England on 19 April 1642 for Edmund Williams. The title became extinct on the death of the second Baronet in 1680.

The Williams Baronetcy, of Minster in the County of Kent, was created in the Baronetage of England on 22 April 1642 for John Williams. The title became extinct on his death in 1669.

The Williams Baronetcy, of Llangibby in the County of Monmouth, was created in the Baronetage of England on 14 May 1642 for Trevor Williams. He later sat as Member of Parliament for Monmouthshire and Monmouth. The second Baronet also represented these constituencies in the House of Commons while the third Baronet sat for Monmouthshire. On the death of the fifth Baronet in 1753 the title became extinct.

The Williams Baronetcy, of Guernevet in the County of Brecon, was created in the Baronetage of England on 4 May 1644 for Henry Williams. He had earlier represented Breconshire in Parliament. The second Baronet sat as Member of Parliament for Brecon.

The Williams, later Williams-Bulkeley Baronetcy, of Penryn in the County of Cornwall, was created in the Baronetage of England on 17 June 1661 for Griffith Williams. For more information on this creation, see Williams-Bulkeley baronets.

The Williams Baronetcy, of Elham in the County of Kent, was created in the Baronetage of England on 12 November 1674 for Thomas Williams, Physician to Charles I and James II. He was later Member of Parliament for Weobley 1675-8. His son, the second Baronet was High Sheriff of Kent in 1668 and represented Herefordshire 1701-5. His nephew succeeded as the third Baronet but the Elham estate passed to his daughter and her husband Thomas Symonds. The fourth and fifth Baronets were sons of the third Baronet. On the latter's death in 1804 the title became either extinct or dormant.

The Williams, later Williams-Wynn Baronetcy, of Gray's Inn in the City of London, was created in the Baronetage of England on 6 July 1688 for Williams Williams. For more information on this creation, see Williams-Wynn baronets.

The Williams Baronetcy, of Edwinsford in the County of Carmarthen, was created in the Baronetage of Great Britain on 30 July 1707 for Nicholas Williams. He was later Member of Parliament for Carmarthenshire. The title became extinct on his death in 1745. The arms of Williams of Edwinsford are: Argent, a lion rampant sable, face, paws & tuft of the tail of the field.

The Williams Baronetcy, of Clapton in the County of Northampton, was created in the Baronetage of Great Britain on 4 April 1747 for Hutchins Williams. The second Baronet represented New Shoreham in the House of Commons. The title became extinct on the death of the third Baronet in 1784.

The Williams Baronetcy, of Bodelwyddan in the County of Flint, was created in the Baronetage of Great Britain on 24 July 1798 for John Williams. He had previously served as High Sheriff of Flintshire. Williams was the great-grandson of John Williams, second son of Sir William Williams, 1st Baronet (see Williams-Wynn Baronets). The second Baronet assumed in 1842 the additional surname of Hay but died without male issue. The title became extinct on the death of the ninth baronet in 2018.

The Williams Baronetcy, of Kars, was created in the Baronetage of the United Kingdom on 18 July 1856 for the soldier William Williams, who represented Calne in Parliament. The title became extinct on his death in 1883.

The Williams Baronetcy, of Tregullow in the County of Cornwall, was created in the Baronetage of the United Kingdom on 4 August 1866 for William Williams, a younger son of the Williams family of Caerhays and Burncoose, a prominent and wealthy Cornish mining family. He served as High Sheriff of Cornwall. The second Baronet was Conservative Member of Parliament for Truro.

The Williams Baronetcy, of the City of London, was created in the Baronetage of the United Kingdom on 30 October 1894 for John Williams. The title became extinct on his death in 1926.

The Williams Baronetcy, of Castell Deudrath, and Borthwen in the County of Merioneth, was created in the Baronetage of the United Kingdom on 28 July 1909 for Osmond Williams. He sat as Liberal Member of Parliament for Merionethshire and served as Lord Lieutenant of Merionethshire. The title became extinct with the death of the second baronet in 2012.

The Williams Baronetcy, of Bridehead in the County of Dorset, was created in the Baronetage of the United Kingdom on 9 February 1915 for Robert Williams, who represented Dorset West in the House of Commons as a Conservative. The family seat is Bridehead, Littlebredy, Dorchester, Dorset.

The Williams, later Rhys Williams Baronetcy, of Miskin in the Parish of Llantrisant in the County of Glamorgan, is a title in the Baronetage of the United Kingdom. It was created in 1918 for Rhys Williams, Member of Parliament for Banbury. or more information on this creation, see Rhys-Williams baronets.

The Williams Baronetcy, of Park in the County of Aberdeen, was created in the Baronetage of the United Kingdom on 29 June 1928 for Robert Williams. The title became extinct on his death in 1938.

The Williams Baronetcy, of Glyndwr in the County of Carmarthen, was created in the Baronetage of the United Kingdom on 10 July 1935 for Evan Williams. The title became extinct on his death in 1959.

The Williams Baronetcy, of Cilgeraint in the County of Carnarvon, was created in the Baronetage of the United Kingdom on 3 July 1953 for the Conservative politician Herbert Williams.  the title is held by his grandson, the third Baronet, who succeeded in 2013.

The Williams Baronetcy, of Llanelly in the County of Carmarthen, was created in the Baronetage of the United Kingdom in 1955 for George Clark Williams QC, who had previously served as Lord Lieutenant of Carmarthenshire. The title became extinct on his death in 1958.

Williams baronets, of Vaynol (1622)
Sir William Williams, 1st Baronet (died )
Sir Thomas Williams, 2nd Baronet (died c. 1650)
Sir William Williams, 3rd Baronet (died c. 1659)
Sir Griffith Williams, 4th Baronet (died c. 1663)
Sir Thomas Williams, 5th Baronet (died c. 1673)
Sir William Williams, 6th Baronet (c. 1668–1696)

Williams baronets, of Marnhull (1642)
Sir Edmund Williams, 1st Baronet (died 1644)
Sir John Williams, 2nd Baronet (1642–1680)

Williams baronets, of Minster (1642)
Sir John Williams, 1st Baronet (c. 1609–1669)

Williams baronets, of Llangibby (1642)
Sir Trevor Williams, 1st Baronet (c. 1622–1692)
Sir John Williams, 2nd Baronet (c. 1651–1704)
Sir Hopton Williams, 3rd Baronet (c. 1663–1723)
Sir John Williams, 4th Baronet (died 1739)
Sir Leonard Williams, 5th Baronet (died 1753)

Williams baronets, of Guernevet (1644)
Sir Henry Williams, 1st Baronet (c. 1607–c. 1652)
Sir Henry Williams, 2nd Baronet (c. 1635–1666)
Sir Walter Williams, 3rd Baronet (c. 1636-c. 1695)

Williams, later Williams-Bulkeley baronets, of Penrhyn (1661)
see Williams-Bulkeley baronets

Williams baronets, of Elham (1674)
Sir Thomas Williams, 1st Baronet (c. 1621–1712)
Sir John Williams, 2nd Baronet (1653–1723)
Sir David Williams, 3rd Baronet (1659–1740)
Sir Henry Williams, 4th Baronet (died 1741)
Sir Edward Williams, 5th Baronet (died 1804)

Williams, later Williams-Wynn baronets, of Gray's Inn (1688)
see Williams-Wynn baronets

Williams baronets, of Edwinsford (1707)
Sir Nicholas Williams, 1st Baronet (1681–1745)

Williams baronets, of Clapton (1747)
Sir Hutchins Williams, 1st Baronet (c. 1700–1758)
Sir William Peere Williams, 2nd Baronet (c. 1730–1761)
Sir Booth Williams, 3rd Baronet (c. 1735–1784)

Williams baronets, of Bodelwyddan (1798)

Sir John Williams, 1st Baronet (1761–1830)
Sir John Hay-Williams, 2nd Baronet (1794–1859)
Sir Hugh Williams, 3rd Baronet (1802–1876)
Sir William Grenville Williams, 4th Baronet (1844–1904)
Sir William Willoughby Williams, 5th Baronet (1888–1932)
Sir Hugh Grenville Williams, 6th Baronet (1889–1961)
Sir Reginald Lawrence William Williams, 7th Baronet (1900–1971)
Sir Francis John Watkin Williams, 8th Baronet (1905–1995)
Sir Lawrence Hugh Williams, 9th Baronet (1929–2018)

Williams baronets, of Kars (1856)
Sir William Fenwick Williams, 1st Baronet (1800–1883)

Williams baronets, of Tregullow (1866)

Sir William Williams, 1st Baronet (1791–1870) <ref>[https://books.google.com/books?id=Ni4BAAAAQAAJ&dq=Burke%27s+landed+gentry+tregullow&pg=PA1668 A Genealogical and Heraldic Dictionary of the Landed Gentry of Great Britain 1863]– Williams of Tregullow article on p.1668, provided by Google Books.</ref>
Sir Frederick Martin Williams, 2nd Baronet (1830–1878)
Sir William Robert Williams, 3rd Baronet (1860–1903) 
Sir William Frederick Williams, 4th Baronet (1886–1905)
Sir Frederick William Williams, 5th Baronet (1888–1913) 
Sir Burton Robert Williams, 6th Baronet (1889–1917) 
Sir Frederick Law Williams, 7th Baronet (1862–1921) 
Sir William Law Williams, 8th Baronet (1907–1960) 
Sir Robert Ernest Williams, 9th Baronet (1924–1976)
Sir Donald Mark Williams, 10th Baronet (born 1954)

The heir presumptive is the present holder's brother Barton Matthew Williams (born 1956).

Williams baronets, of the City of London (1894)
Sir John Williams, 1st Baronet (1840–1926)

Williams baronets, of Castell Deudraeth and Borthwen (1909)
Sir (Arthur) Osmond Williams, 1st Baronet (1849–1927)
Sir (Michael) Osmond Williams, 2nd Baronet (1914–2012)

Williams baronets, of Bridehead (1915)
Sir Robert Williams, 1st Baronet (1848–1943)
Sir Philip Francis Cunningham Williams, 2nd Baronet (1884–1958)
Sir David Philip Williams, 3rd Baronet (1909–1970)
Sir (Robert) Philip Nathaniel Williams, 4th Baronet (born 1950)

The heir apparent is the present holder's only son David Robert Mark Williams (born 1980).

Williams, later Rhys Williams baronets, of Miskin (1918)
See Rhys-Williams baronets

Williams baronets, of Park (1928)
Sir Robert Williams, 1st Baronet (1860–1938)

Williams baronets, of Glyndwr (1935)
Sir Evan Williams, 1st Baronet (1871–1959)

Williams baronets, of Cilgeraint (1953)
Sir Herbert Geraint Williams, 1st Baronet (1884–1954)
Sir Robin Philip Williams, 2nd Baronet (1928–2013)
Sir Anthony Geraint Williams, 3rd Baronet (born 1958)

Williams baronets, of Llanelly (1955)
Sir George Clark Williams, 1st Baronet (1878–1958)

 See also 
Williams-Drummond baronets
Dudley-Williams baronets

 Notes 

 References 
Kidd, Charles, Williamson, David (editors). Debrett's Peerage and Baronetage'' (1990 edition). New York: St Martin's Press, 1990, 

Baronetcies in the Baronetage of England
Extinct baronetcies in the Baronetage of England
Extinct baronetcies in the Baronetage of Great Britain
Baronetcies in the Baronetage of the United Kingdom
Extinct baronetcies in the Baronetage of the United Kingdom
1622 establishments in England
1707 establishments in Great Britain
1828 establishments in the United Kingdom